Geoffrey Lewis FRPSL is an Australian philatelist who was appointed to the Roll of Distinguished Philatelists in 2018. He is a member of the Australian Philatelic Order and has received the Australian Philatelic Research Award.

References

Australian philatelists
Living people
Signatories to the Roll of Distinguished Philatelists
Philatelic authors
Year of birth missing (living people)
Fellows of the Royal Philatelic Society London